The 1934 Oregon gubernatorial election took place on November 6, 1934 to elect the governor of the U.S. state of Oregon. Democrat Charles H. Martin, who retired from the United States House of Representatives to run for governor, won a plurality over Republican Oregon State Senator Peter Zimmerman (who ran as an Independent), Republican nominee Joe E. Dunne, also a state senator, and several minor candidates. Willis Mahoney unsuccessfully sought the Democratic nomination, while Rufus C. Holman unsuccessfully sought the Republican nomination. Oregon would not elect another Democratic governor until 1956. As of 2022, this is also the last gubernatorial election in which Malheur County supported the Democratic candidate.

Election results

References

Gubernatorial
1934
Oregon
November 1934 events